Maate Mantramu is an Indian Telugu-language romantic drama television series which aired on Zee Telugu from 7 May 2018. It stars Ali Reza and Pallavi Ramisetty. This show was remade into Kannada as Radha Kalyana and Tamil as Gokulathil Seethai on the networks Zee Kannada and Zee Tamil respectively.

Cast
 Ali Reza / Karthik as Vamsi Krishna
 Pallavi Ramisetty as Vasundara
 Siva Parvathy as Grandma
 Karati Kalyani
 Aarya
 Manasa 
 Ravikiran as Murali

Adaptations

References

External links

Zee Telugu original programming
Indian television soap operas
2017 Indian television series debuts
Telugu-language television shows
2020 Indian television series endings